Beyond the Wildwood – A Tribute to Syd Barrett is a tribute album consisting of music written by Pink Floyd's original guitarist, vocalist and primary songwriter Syd Barrett. The musicians performing on the album are British and American indie rock artists. The songs featured come from Pink Floyd's singles; the albums The Piper at the Gates of Dawn and A Saucerful of Secrets; and Barrett's two solo albums: The Madcap Laughs and Barrett. Although Barrett's productive recording career had only lasted from 1967 though 1970, his music had a great influence on the development of psychedelic rock, alternative rock and indie rock music.

Track listing
All songs written by Syd Barrett, except where noted.

References

Syd Barrett tribute albums
Pink Floyd
Imaginary Records compilation albums
1987 compilation albums
Alternative rock compilation albums